

Events
 January – Drexel University faced Temple University in the schools first organized games.  Drexel beat temple by a score of 26-1.

 February 9 – The first recorded game between two American college teams occurred, when Hamline University faced Minnesota A&M (which later became a part of the University of Minnesota).  Minnesota A&M won the game, which was played under rules allowing nine players per side, 9–3.

References